Malek Ali (also Romanized as Malek ʿAlī; also known as Posht Tang-e Soflá and Poshteh Tang-e Pā’īn) is a village in Tarhan-e Sharqi Rural District, Tarhan District, Kuhdasht County, Lorestan Province, Iran. At the 2006 census, its population was 135, in 22 families.

References 

Towns and villages in Kuhdasht County